Trephionus abiba, is a species of beetle belonging to the family Carabidae. It is endemic to Japan.

Etymology
The specific name abiba is  an anagram of the sympatric species Trephionus babai.

Description
Body length of male is about 8.1 mm, whereas female is 9.8 mm. Head and pronotum black. Elytra blackish brown to black. Endophallus stout in shape. No hind wings. Dorso-apical lobe simple and rudimentary. Apex of aedeagus truncate.

References

Beetles described in 2018
Platyninae